Varda is a village in the municipality of Kosjerić in western Serbia. According to the 2011 census, the village has a population of 230 inhabitants.

References

Populated places in Zlatibor District